Téa Mutonji is a Canadian writer and poet, whose debut short story collection Shut Up You're Pretty was published in 2019.

Early life 
Born in the Democratic Republic of the Congo, Mutonji came to Canada with her family when she was young and grew up in the Scarborough district of Toronto and in Oshawa.  While living in Scarborough, she worked in the service industry.  She then studied media studies and creative writing at the University of Toronto Scarborough, and planned to go to law school when she was selected as the first writer to be published by VS. Books, Vivek Shraya's new Arsenal Pulp Press imprint for emerging writers of colour.

Works
Shut Up You're Pretty, published in 2019, is a collection of linked short stories about a young girl's coming of age in Scarborough's Galloway neighbourhood.  The novel centers around Loli and her experiences, which include, her moving from the Democratic Republic of the Congo to Canada, her sexual experiences, her grappling with gender roles, and issues revolving around poverty and consent.  Mutonji wrote the novel in part to counter negative stereotypes of the neighbourhood with a narrative that depicted some of her own more positive experiences of having lived there.

Currently, Mutonji is working on an anthology with Adrian De Leon and Natasha Ramoutar.  The anthology focuses on Scarborough writing.

Themes 
In an interview with CityNews, Mutonji stated that she writes from an "activist lens".

Mutonji describes that being called pretty is not a compliment.  It is offensive because it prioritizes women’s physical appearance and overshadows every other attribute a woman can be.  Instead, Mutonji describes a shift that is happening where women demand that their character is looked at first.

Accolades 
Mutonji has received several major awards for her work, including:

 2020 Edmund White Award for debut fiction for Shut Up You're Pretty.
 2020 Trillium Book Award for Shut Up You're Pretty.

She was also named a finalist for the 2019 Rogers Writers' Trust Fiction Prize.  In 2017, the Ontario Book Publishers Organization named Mutonji an emerging writer of the year.

References

21st-century Canadian short story writers
21st-century Canadian women writers
Black Canadian women
Black Canadian writers
Canadian women short story writers
University of Toronto alumni
Writers from Toronto
Living people
Year of birth missing (living people)